Tatars in Azerbaijan are Azerbaijani citizens and people of Tatar origin. According to the 2009 census, 25,882 Tatars live in the Republic of Azerbaijan. This is 0.29% of the total population.

Community 

Tatars are mainly assembled in major cities of Azerbaijan:Baku, Sumqayit, Ganja, Khachmaz, Guba, Gabala, etc. More than 90% of the Tatar community lives in Baku. 25,171 Tatars live here. They are the third largest ethnic group in Baku after Azerbaijani Turks and Russians. Location of Tatars living in Azerbaijan by regions:

Religion and language 

Tatars are mainly Muslims. They believe in Hanafi madhhab of Islam.

Fellowship 

Tatar communities in the Republic of Azerbaijan:

«Tugan Tel» Society of Tatars in the Republic of Azerbaijan (Baku)
«Yaşlek» Society of Tatars in the Republic of Azerbaijan (Baku)

Celebrities 

Tajuddin Mustafin - the first mufti of Caucasian Muslims and Azerbaijan (1832-1840).
Maciej Sulkiewicz - Head of the General Staff of the Army of the Azerbaijan Democratic Republic.
Eldar Gasimov - Azerbaijani singer and musician. Her great-grandmother is Marziya Davudova, who used to play on the stage of the Astrakhan Tatar Drama Theater.
Marziyya Davudova - Azerbaijani and Soviet theatre and film actress, People's Artist of the USSR and Azerbaijan. 
Firangiz Sharifova - People's Artist of the Republic of Azerbaijan
Aliya Garayeva - Azerbaijani rhythmic gymnast
Zemfira Meftahatdinova - The first Olympic champion of independent Azerbaijan (shooting).
Dinara Gimatova - Azerbaijani rhythmic gymnast
Ramis Alimov - Martyr of January 20, "Fighter for Freedom" (1992) and "Martyr of January 20" (1998) honorary titles
Fargat Tukhtamishev - Martyr of January 20, "Fighter for Freedom" (1992) and "Martyr of January 20" (1998) honorary titles
Khadija Gayibova - One of the first female pianists of Azerbaijan.
Farid Khayrulin - Azerbaijani photojournalist.
Hanafi Teregulov - Azerbaijani opera singer, baritone, theater figure and public figure, one of the founders of the opera choir in Azerbaijan.
Aziz Gubaydullin - professor, writer, historian, victim of repression

References 

Demographics of Azerbaijan